The Central District of Pakdasht County is in Tehran province, Iran. At the National Census in 2006, its population was 203,050 in 51,476 households. The following census in 2011 counted 249,456 people in 69,901 households. At the latest census in 2016, the district had 286,528 inhabitants in 84,786 households.

References 

Pakdasht County

Districts of Tehran Province

Populated places in Tehran Province

Populated places in Pakdasht County